St. Mary's Polish Church is a Roman Catholic church in Whitney Pier, a neighbourhood of Sydney, Nova Scotia. Founded in 1913, the parish serves the Polish community in Cape Breton and is the only parish serving a Polish community in Canada east of Montreal. It is a parish in the Diocese of Antigonish. The church was designated a Nova Scotian heritage property in 1984.

References 

Roman Catholic churches in Nova Scotia
Heritage sites in Nova Scotia
Buildings and structures in the Cape Breton Regional Municipality